21st SFBAFCC Awards
January 9, 2023

Best Picture:
The Banshees of Inisherin

Best Animated Feature:
Guillermo del Toro's Pinocchio

Best Documentary Feature:
All That Breathes

Best International Feature Film:
Decision to Leave

The 21st San Francisco Bay Area Film Critics Circle Awards, honoring the best in film for 2022, were given on January 9, 2023. The nominations were announced on January 6, 2023, with The Banshees of Inisherin leading the nominations with eleven. The film won Best Picture, though Tár received the most awards, with four wins, including Best Director (Todd Field) and Best Actress (Cate Blanchett).

Winners and nominees

These are the nominees for the 21st SFFCC Awards. Winners are listed at the top of each list:

Special awards

Special Citation for Independent Cinema
 Emergency
 Servants
 Topside

Marlon Riggs Award
 Phil Tippett

References

External links
 Official website

2022 film awards
2022 in San Francisco
San Francisco Film Critics Circle Awards